Alfred Downey (born 1897) was an Irish professional footballer who played as a left half.

Career
Born in Dublin, Downey played for Bohemians, Bradford City and Halifax Town.

For Bradford City he made 1 appearance in the Football League.

Sources

References

1897 births
Year of death missing
Irish association footballers (before 1923)
Bohemian F.C. players
Bradford City A.F.C. players
Halifax Town A.F.C. players
English Football League players
Association football wing halves
Association footballers from Dublin (city)